Elections to the Australian Capital Territory Legislative Assembly were held on Saturday, 4 March 1989. This was the first direct election by voters in the Australian Capital Territory (ACT) for their own legislative body.

The Labor Party, led by Rosemary Follett, and the Liberal Party, led by Trevor Kaine, were the main challengers. Candidates were elected to fill seats using modified d'Hondt electoral system for a multi-member single (at-large) constituency. 

The result was a hung parliament. However, Labor, with the largest representation in the 17-member unicameral Assembly, formed Government with the support of various non-aligned minor parties. Follett was elected the first Chief Minister at the first sitting of the first Assembly on 11 May 1989.

Key dates

 Party Register opened for Parliamentary Parties: 7 December 1988
 Party Register opened for non-Parliamentary Parties: 6 January 1989
 Party Register closed: 26 January 1989
 Pre-election period commenced/nominations opened: 27 January 1989
 Rolls closed: 3 February 1989
 Nominations closed: 10 February 1989
 Polling day: 4 March 1989
 Poll declared: 8 May 1989
 Legislative Assembly formed: 11 May 1989

Overview

Background to self-government in the Australian Capital Territory
See Australian Capital Territory House of Assembly
The Australian Capital Territory was established in 1911, initially called the Federal Capital Territory. The Territory was carved out of the state of New South Wales to make way for the site of the capital of Australia. As the Territory grew, particularly the city of Canberra from the 1960s, there were increasing calls for some form of self-government. There were a number of appointed and elected advisory bodies between 1920 and 1986. The main elected representative body of the ACT was the Australian Capital Territory House of Assembly that sat from 1975 to 1986. This House served primarily as an advisory body, with most legislative powers managed by the Federal Minister for the Territories, under section 122 of the Australian Constitution. In an advisory referendum held in 1978, voters in the ACT rejected a proposal for self-government, with 63% voting in favour of the proposition that the 'present arrangements for governing the Australian capital should continue for the time being'. Thirty percent of voters favoured self-government with a locally elected body with state-like powers, and 6% voted for a locally elected body with powers and functions similar to those of local government. In spite of the referendum outcome, in 1983, the federal Labor government of Prime Minister Bob Hawke set up a Self-Government Task Force to report on the government of the ACT. Further, it wanted to force the ACT into line with the states on funding levels and, in late 1988, the Australian Government passed the Australian Capital Territory (Self-Government) Act, allowing for the self-government of the ACT.

Political parties and election process
The Australian Capital Territory comprised one electorate for the election. However, electors were only able to cast ordinary votes within their own federal electoral seats of either Canberra or Fraser. The election was conducted by the Australian Electoral Commission, operating under Commonwealth legislation. The election was notable for having a ballot paper almost one-metre wide that listed 117 candidates for election representing 22 political parties. A number of parties ran in opposition to self-government and there was a number of people taking full advantage of some of the more ludicrous or ridiculous aspects of the ballot paper. The parties include the "Sun-Ripened Warm Tomato Party", "Party! Party! Party!" and "Surprise Party".

The centre-left Labor Party, led by Rosemary Follett, and the centre-right Liberal Party, led by Trevor Kaine, were the main challengers. Three minor parties also played a prominent role in the campaign including Residents Rally, a self described "community-based urban green party", led by Bernard Collaery, as well as two parties campaigning on platforms of opposing self-government.

Candidates

At the inaugural election, candidates were elected to fill seats using a modified D'Hondt method for a multi-member single constituency covering the entire Territory. Seventeen vacancies were available to fill the unicameral ACT Legislative Assembly. Tickets that elected at least one MLA are highlighted in the relevant colour. Successful candidates are indicated by an asterisk (*).

Abolished ACT House of Assembly candidates
With the ACT House of Assembly abolished in 1986, the following elected representatives from the previous House nominated as candidates for election to the inaugural ACT Legislative Assembly:

Labor
 Barry Reid
 Paul Whalan

Liberal
 Greg Cornwell
 Trevor Kaine
 Peter Kobold

Independents
 Harold Hird

Nationals
 David Adams (sat as a Liberal MHA)

Family Team
 Bev Cains

All candidates and parties seeking election

Result

|}

It took almost two months after election day to determine the results of the election. Four people won seats on ostensible platforms of abolishing self-government. The result was a hung parliament. First preference results of the major contenders at conclusion of the final count were: Labor Party – 22.8 per cent, Liberal – 14.9 per cent, No Self-Government Party – 11.5 per cent, Residents Rally – 9.6 per cent, and Abolish Self-Government Coalition – 7.5 per cent. Other candidates and parties that polled well, but failed to achieve a quota included Fair Elections Coalition (5.5%), John Haslem (4.8%), The A.C.T. Community Party (4.1%), and Bill Mackay (4.0%).

Following distribution of preferences, the membership of the first Assembly was one member from the Abolish Self-Government Coalition; five members from the Australian Labor Party; four members from the Liberal Party; three members from the No Self-Government Party and four members from the Residents Rally. Labor, with the largest representation in the 17-member unicameral Assembly, formed a minority Government. Follett was elected the first Chief Minister at the first sitting of the first Assembly on 11 May 1989, sitting in rented premises at 1 Constitution Avenue, Canberra City. The final sitting of the first Assembly was on 17 December 1991.

Officers
The office holders of the first Assembly were:
Speaker: David Prowse (No Self-Government Party)
Chief Minister: Rosemary Follett (Labor)
Leader of the Opposition: Trevor Kaine (Liberal)

See also
 Australian Capital Territory (Self-Government) Act 1988
 Electoral systems of the Australian states and territories#Australian Capital Territory
 Members of the Australian Capital Territory Legislative Assembly, 1989-1991
 First Follett Ministry
 Kaine Ministry
 Second Follett Ministry
 List of Australian Capital Territory elections

External links
 ACT Electoral Commission – 1989 election
 ACT Legislative Assembly – List of Members (1989–2008) 
 ACT Election compendium (2004)
 ABC Stateline 20 Years of Self Government (2009)

References

Elections in the Australian Capital Territory
1989 elections in Australia
March 1989 events in Australia
1980s in the Australian Capital Territory